Arab, Afghanistan or Ərəb may refer to:
 Ərəb, Agdash
 Ərəb, Khachmaz
 Arab, Masally
 Ərəb Qubalı
 Ərəb Yengicə